

The Grande Dixence Dam is a concrete gravity dam on the Dixence at the head of the Val d'Hérémence in the canton of Valais in Switzerland. It is part of the Cleuson-Dixence Complex.

The dam withholds the Lac des Dix (meaning: "Lake of the Ten"), its reservoir. With a surface area of 4 km2, it is the second largest lake in Valais and the largest lake above 2,000 m in the Alps. The reservoir receives its water from four different pumping stations; the Z’Mutt, Stafel, Ferpècle and Arolla. Construction on the dam began in 1950 and was completed in 1961, before officially commissioning in 1965.

History 

In 1922, Energie Ouest Suisse (EOS) became established with a few small power stations. To generate substantial amounts of electricity, EOS looked to the Valais canton which contains 56% of Switzerland's glaciers and stores the largest amount of water in Europe. In 1927, EOS acquired the license for the upper Dixence basin. In 1929, 1,200 workers constructed the first Dixence dam which would be complete in 1935. The first dam would supply water to the Chandoline Power Station which has a capacity of 120 MW.

After the Second World War, growing industries needed electricity and construction on the Cleuson Dam began in 1947 and was completed in 1951. The original Dixence dam was submerged by the filling of Lac des Dix beginning in 1957, it can still be seen when the reservoir level is low.
Plans for the Super Dixence Dam were finalized by the recently founded company, Grande Dixence SA. Construction on the Super Dixence Dam began in late 1950. By 1961, 3,000 workers had finished pouring  of concrete, completing the dam. 
At 285 m, it was the world's tallest dam at the time, but it was surpassed by the Nurek Dam of Tajikistan in 1972 (300 m). It remains the world's tallest gravity dam.

In the 1980s, Grande Dixence SA and EOS began the Cleuson-Dixence project which improved the quality of electricity produced by building new tunnels along with the Bieudron Power Station. By the time the Cleuson-Dixence Complex was complete, the power generated had more than doubled.

A short documentary film, Opération béton, was made about the dam's construction by Jean-Luc Godard as first-time director.

Characteristics 

Although the dam is situated on the relatively small Dixence, water supplied from other rivers and streams is pumped by the Z’Mutt, Stafel, Ferpècle and Arolla pumping stations. The pumping stations transport the water through  of tunnels into Lac des Dix. Three penstocks transport water from Lac des Dix to the Chandoline, Fionnay, Nendaz and Bieudron power stations, before being discharged into the Rhône below. All the pumping stations, power stations and dams form the Cleuson-Dixence Complex. Although the complex operates with water being pumped from one reservoir to another, it does not technically qualify as a pumped-storage scheme.

Most of the water comes from glaciers melting during the summer. The lake is usually at full capacity by late September, and empties during the winter, eventually reaching its lowest point around April.

Power stations

Chandoline Power Station 
The Chandoline Power Station was the power station for the original Dixence Dam. The Grande Dixence Dam submerged the original dam but the power station still operates with water received from the reservoir of the Grande Dixence Dam, Lac des Dix.

Fionnay Power Station 
Once the tunnel reaches a surge chamber at Louvie in Bagnes, it turns into a penstock which descends at a gradient of 73% for  until it reaches the power station.

Nendaz Power Station 

The Nendaz power station is located within mountains between Aproz and Riddes and is the second-largest hydroelectric power station in Switzerland after the Bieudron Power Station.

Bieudron Power Station 

The water travels down a long penstock from the Grande Dixence Dam before reaching the Bieudron Power Station  down. The power station was constructed after the Nendaz and Fionnay power stations. The power station was built by both Grande Dixence SA and Energie Ouest Suisse between 1993 and 1998 at a cost of US$1.2 billion.
 
The Bieudron Power Station alone holds three world records, for the height of its head, the output of each Pelton turbine  and the output per pole of the generators . It was taken out of service in December 2000 after the rupture of a penstock. The power station became partially operational in December 2009 and fully operational in 2010.

See also

List of lakes of Switzerland
List of mountain lakes of Switzerland

References

External links 

 
 
 Grande Dixence
 Cycling Profile for route to La Grande Dixence

Dams in Switzerland
Gravity dams
Buildings and structures in Valais
Tourist attractions in Switzerland
Dams completed in 1961
Lakes of Valais
20th-century architecture in Switzerland